Piotr Piecuch (born January 21, 1960) is a Polish-born American physical chemist. He holds the title of University Distinguished Professor in the Department of Chemistry at Michigan State University, East Lansing, Michigan, United States. He supervises a group, whose research focuses on theoretical and computational chemistry as well as theoretical and computational physics, particularly on the development and applications of many-body methods for accurate quantum calculations for molecular systems and atomic nuclei, including methods based on coupled cluster theory, mathematical methods of chemistry and physics, and theory of intermolecular forces. His group is also responsible for the development of the coupled-cluster computer codes incorporated in the widely used GAMESS (US) package.

Education and academic posts
Piecuch studied chemistry at the undergraduate and graduate levels at the University of Wrocław, Poland. He received his M.S. degree in 1983 and Ph.D. degree in 1988. After postdoctoral and research faculty appointments at the University of Waterloo, Canada (1988–91, 1994–95), where he worked with Professors Josef Paldus and Jiri Čížek, University of Arizona (1992–93), where he worked with Professor Ludwik Adamowicz, University of Toronto, Canada (1995–97), where he worked with the recipient of the 1986 Nobel Prize in Chemistry, Professor John C. Polanyi, and University of Florida (1997–98), where he worked with Professor Rodney J. Bartlett, he joined the faculty at Michigan State University as an assistant professor in 1998. He was promoted to an associate professor in 2002 and professor in 2004. He was named a University Distinguished Professor in 2007. While his primary appointment at Michigan State University is with the Department of Chemistry, he has also held adjunct professorship appointments in the Department of Physics and Astronomy (2003–10, 2014-). During his tenure at Michigan State University, he was named a visiting professor at the University of Coimbra, Portugal (2006), Kyoto University, Japan (2005), Institute for Molecular Science, National Institutes of Natural Sciences, in Okazaki, Japan (2012–13), and a Clark Way Harrison Distinguished Visiting Professor at the Washington University in St. Louis, United States (2016). The latter visit resulted in the creation of the on-line lecture series on algebraic and diagrammatic methods for many-fermion systems, consisting of more than 40 high-definition videos, available on YouTube.

Research interests and accomplishments
Piecuch has established himself as one of the leaders of electronic structure theory. Of particular note are his contributions to coupled-cluster and many-body theories. His work on the renormalized and active-space coupled-cluster methods is especially important, since the resulting approximations, such as CR-CC(2,3), CCSDt, or CC(t;3), and their extensions utilizing the equation-of-motion coupled-cluster concepts, for example, CR-EOMCC, EOMCCSDt, etc., can accurately describe potential energy surfaces, biradicals, and electronic excitations in molecules without resorting to complex multi-reference wave functions.

In general, Piecuch has been among the early and lead developers of multi-reference, response, extended, generalized, and externally corrected coupled-cluster methods, including approximate coupled-pair approaches for strongly correlated systems. His group and collaborators have also implemented linear scaling, local correlation coupled-cluster methods for large systems. The resulting multi-level local schemes that combine higher-level methods, such as CR-CC(2,3), to treat reactive parts of large molecular systems, with lower-order local or canonical methods, such as MP2 or CCSD, to describe chemically inactive regions are particularly valuable.

Although the exponential wave function ansatz of coupled-cluster theory was originally proposed by nuclear physicists, it initially found limited applications in  nuclear structure theory. Piecuch and his associates, and their co-workers working in the area of nuclear theory have demonstrated the great utility of quantum-chemistry-inspired coupled-cluster approximations in the field of nuclear physics.

In addition to his coupled-cluster work, Piecuch has made major contributions to fundamental understanding and formal description of intermolecular forces, particularly pairwise non-additive effects, and developed potential energy surface extrapolation schemes based on scaling correlation energies. He has applied theoretical methods to solve many important problems in chemistry and physics. This is exemplified in papers by his group and collaborators on spectroscopy, reaction dynamics, ro-vibrational resonances in van der Waals complexes, several important reaction mechanisms in organic and bioinorganic chemistry, catalysis, and photochemistry.

As of July 6, 2018, his research has resulted in more than 200 publications that according to the Web of Science have received more than 10,100 citations and the h-index of 56. On July 6, 2018, Google Scholar reported more than 11,500 citations and the h-index of 61. In particular, Piecuch's original contributions to coupled-cluster theory, as applied to molecular problems, have been extensively discussed in the scientific literature. His intermolecular forces theory effort has been reviewed by several authors as well. His nuclear coupled-cluster theory research, in addition to being cited in the scientific literature, has received attention in more popular publications. As of July 6, 2018, he has given 235 invited lectures at national and international symposia, and academic and research institutions in the United States, Australia, Brazil, Canada, Chile, China, Czech Republic, France, Germany, Greece, Hungary, India, Italy, Japan, New Zealand, Poland, Portugal, Russia, Slovakia, South Africa, Spain, Sweden, Switzerland, Tunisia, and United Kingdom. He has co-edited 6 books and 2 special journal issues, and served on many scientific committees and advisory boards, including the editorial boards of several scientific journals and book series.

Selected publications

Awards and honors
Piecuch is an elected member of the International Academy of Quantum Molecular Science (2018), an elected Fellow of the Royal Society of Chemistry (2016), an elected Distinguished Fellow of the Kosciuszko Foundation Collegium of Eminent Scientists (2015), an elected Fellow of the American Association for the Advancement of Science (2011), an elected Fellow of the American Physical Society (2008), an Elected Member of the European Academy of Sciences, Arts and Humanities in Paris, France (2003), and a recipient of a number of other awards and honors, including, in addition to the title of the University Distinguished Professor that he received in 2007, the Lawrence J. Schaad Lectureship in Theoretical Chemistry at Vanderbilt University (2017), the S.R. Palit Memorial Lecture at the Indian Association for the Cultivation of Science (Kolkata, India, 2007), the Invitation Fellowship of the Japan Society for the Promotion of Science (2005), the QSCP Promising Scientist Prize of Centre de Mécanique Ondulatoire Appliquée, France, for "Scientific and Human Endeavour and Achievement" (2004), the Alfred P. Sloan Research Fellowship (2002–2004), the Wiley–International Journal of Quantum Chemistry Young Investigator Award (2000), three awards from the Polish Chemical Society for Research (1983, 1986, 1992), the award from the Minister of National Education of Poland (1989), and two awards from the Polish Academy of Sciences (1982).

Personal life
Piecuch was born in Wrocław, Poland to Telesfor and Hanna Piecuch, and has one sister, Katarzyna. He is married to Jolanta Piecuch (maiden name Sanetra). They have one child, Anna Piecuch.

References

External resources 
 Piotr Piecuch's MSU profile

1960 births
Living people
American physical chemists
Theoretical chemists
Michigan State University faculty
Fellows of the American Physical Society
Fellows of the American Association for the Advancement of Science
Fellows of the Royal Society of Chemistry
Members of the International Academy of Quantum Molecular Science
American people of Polish descent
Polish physical chemists
Canadian physical chemists
Computational chemists